Bruce James MacVittie (October 14, 1956 – May 7, 2022) was an American actor. He was known for playing Danny Scalercio in the fourth season of The Sopranos, Mickey Mack in Million Dollar Baby, and Detective Eastman in Lonely Hearts.

Early life
MacVittie was born in Providence, Rhode Island, on October 14, 1956.

Career
MacVittie has made guest appearances on television shows, including Miami Vice, The Equalizer, L.A. Law, Homicide: Life on the Street, Sex and the City, Oz, The Unit, Numbers, Blue Bloods and Chicago Med.

In 2002, MacVittie appeared as Danny Scalerio in the HBO drama television series The Sopranos for its fourth season. He appeared as Mickey Mack in the 2004 Academy Award-winning sports drama film Million Dollar Baby, featuring Clint Eastwood, Hilary Swank and Morgan Freeman.

Personal life
In 1997, MacVittie was married to Carol Ochs until his death 25 years later in 2022.

Death
MacVittie died on May 7, 2022, in New York City. He was 65. In an interview, Al Pacino said, "His performances were always glistening and crackling; a heart and a joy to watch. He was the embodiment of the struggling actor in New York City, and he made it work."

Filmography

Film

Television

Video games

References

External links

1956 births
2022 deaths
20th-century American male actors
21st-century American male actors
American male film actors
American male television actors
American male voice actors
Male actors from Rhode Island
People from Providence, Rhode Island